Nicolas Beauzée (9 May 1717 in Verdun, Meuse – 23 January 1789 in Paris) was a French linguist, author of Grammaire générale (published 1767) and one of the main contributors to the Encyclopédie of Denis Diderot and Jean-Baptiste le Rond d'Alembert on the topic of grammar. In 1772 he was named as the successor to Charles Pinot Duclos in the Académie française.

Life and work

Early years and tenure at École Militaire
Beauzée was born on 9 May 1717 in Verdun. The Church register for the parish of Saint-Sauveur lists his father as a labourer (manouvrier). A scholarship allowed him to attend the Jesuit college at Verdun.

Further reading

References

External links
 

1717 births
1789 deaths
People from Verdun
Contributors to the Encyclopédie (1751–1772)
Grammarians from France
18th-century French writers
18th-century French male writers
French male non-fiction writers